Uppal may refer to:

Places
 Uppal Kalan, a suburb of Hyderabad, India
 Uppal Jagir, Jalandhar, Jalandhar, India

People
 Chandeep Uppal (born 1988), British actress
Deana Uppal (b. 1989), English beauty pageant titleholder, actress and business entrepreneur
 Dharam Singh Uppal (born 1959), Indian Superintendent of Police and former athlete
 Jack Uppal, 2012 Democratic candidate for California's 4th congressional district
 Paul Uppal (born 1967),  British conservative politician
 Priscila Uppal (1974-2018), Canadian poet and novelist
 Sheraz Uppal, Pakistani singer and songwriter
 Stephen Uppal (born 1982), English actor
 Tim Uppal (born 1974), Canadian conservative politician
 Vikas Uppal (1986–2007), native and resident of India, said to be his country's tallest man until his death

See also
Upal
Uppala